The NAACP Image Award winners for the Chairman's Award:

References

NAACP Image Awards